The 1996 St Helens RLFC season was the 101st season in the club's rugby league history and the first season in the Super League. Coached by Shaun McRae, the Saints competed in Super League I and finished in 1st place, and also went on to win the 1996 Challenge Cup, beating Bradford Bulls in the final.

Table

Squad
Statistics include appearances and points in the Super League, Challenge Cup and Premiership Trophy.

References

External links
Saints Heritage Society
St Helens - Rugby League Project

St Helens R.F.C. seasons
St Helens RLFC